The women's cross-country eliminator (XCE) is an event at the annual UCI Urban Cycling World Championships. From 2012 to 2016 the UCI world championships in the XCE were held as part of the UCI Mountain Bike & Trials World Championships.

Medalists

Medals by country

References

External links
UCI mountain biking page

Events at the UCI Mountain Bike & Trials World Championships